Proinsias is a given name. Notable people with the name include:

People 
 Proinsias De Rossa (born 1940), Irish Labour Party politician
 Proinsias Mac Airt (1922–1992), Irish republican activist
 Proinsias Mac Aonghusa (1933–2003), Irish journalist, writer, tv presenter, and campaigner
 Proinsias Mac Cana (1926–2004), academic and Celtic scholar
 Proinsias Ó Doibhlin (died 1724), Irish Franciscan friar, poet, and scribe
 Proinsias Ó Maonaigh (1922–2006), fiddler from Ireland

Characters 
 Proinsias Cassidy, character from the Preacher comic book series

See also 
 Francis (given name)